is the 20th mayor of Nagoya City in , Japan. He was first elected in April 1997.

Biography 
Matsubara served as a primary and secondary school teacher in his early career. His subject was the National Language of Japan, Japanese. He was later a school principal and also Superintendent of Schools for the City of Nagoya. He was inaugurated as Mayor of Nagoya in April 1997. In 2005 he was elected to his third term as Mayor. In City Council he has welcomed recommendations from all factions and parties barring only the JCP (Japanese Communist Party) representative. He has been known to show great enthusiasm for large building projects, but has been weak on social welfare issues.

On October 23, 2008, Mayor Matsubara announced that he would not be running for re-election in the Spring of 2009 due to health concerns over his advanced age (71). The Asahi Shimbun reports, however, that fall-out from his recent "slush fund" scandal may also have contributed to his decision to stand down after more than a decade in office.

On April 1, 2015, he was appointed the president of Tokai Gakuen University(Miyoshi, Aichi).

References 

1937 births
Living people
People from Nagoya
People from Owariasahi, Aichi
Mayors of Nagoya
Aichi University of Education alumni